Teacher of the Year is a 2019 Gujarati drama film directed by Dr. Vikram Panchal, Shounak Vyas and produced by Jayantibhai R Tank and Parth Tank under the banner of
Parth Tank Production. It is a reboot of the 2014 film of the same name. The film starring Shounak Vyas, Alisha Prajapati, Mehul Buch, Ragi Jani, Nisarg Trivedi and Archan Trivedi, has music by Prathmesh Bhatt. The story of the film revolves around the relationship between a teacher and his students and the struggles faced by them. It was released on 13 September 2019 by Rupam Entertainment.

Cast 
 Shounak Vyas as Parth
 Alisha Prajapati as Reva 
 Mehul Buch as Professor Shastri 
 Ragi Jani as Iqbal shaikh
 Nisarg Trivedi as Gaurishankar
 Archan Trivedi as Mehul Bhai  
 Chaitanyakrishna Raval as Chaitanya 
 Jiya Bhatt as Bulbul 
 Jitendra Thakkar as Sutta bhai 
 Jahnvi Chauhan as Swati 
 Raunaq Kamdar as Anchor
 Premal Yagnik as Shankar Sodha 
 Rekha Mukharjee as Rekha 
 Pranay Mehta as Hari Mehta 
 Parmeshwar Sirsikar as Himmatsinh Rathod
 Karan Patel as Junior Parth 
 Jash Thakkar as Jago 
 Ankit Gajera as Samant 
Yuvraj Gadhvi as Jatin 
 Charmi Jani as Maya 
 Himadry Joshi as Julie 
 Antra Thkkar as Muskan

Production
Teacher of the year shoot in Ahmedabad.   Music of the film is given by Prathmesh Bhatt.  Songs have been Sung by Kirtidan Gadhvi, sunny shah, and Chorus by kids. The lyrics of the song have been written by Anil Chavda, Tejas Dave and Shounak Vyas. The shoot of the film has been completed in 2019

Release
The trailer of the film was released on 22 August 2019.

The film was released on 13 September 2019.

References

External links
 

2019 films
Films shot in India
Films shot in Gujarat
Films about educators
Films set in schools
Schools in fiction
Films about the education system in India
2010s Gujarati-language films